Dale is a village in Sel Municipality in Innlandet county, Norway. The village is located along the Otta River. The Norwegian National Road 15 runs through the village.

Since 2020, the population and area data for this village area has not been separately tracked by Statistics Norway and it has been considered part of the urban area of the town of Otta.

References

Sel
Villages in Innlandet